The Second Fernández Vara Government was the regional government of Extremadura led by President Guillermo Fernández Vara. It was formed in July 2015 after the regional election and ended in July 2019 following the regional election.

Government

References

2015 establishments in Extremadura
2019 disestablishments in Extremadura
Cabinets established in 2015
Cabinets disestablished in 2019
Cabinets of Extremadura